The Cumaean Sibyl was the priestess presiding over the Apollonian oracle at Cumae, a Greek colony located near Naples, Italy. The word sibyl comes (via Latin) from the ancient Greek word sibylla, meaning prophetess. There were many sibyls in different locations throughout the ancient world. Because of the importance of the Cumaean Sibyl in the legends of early Rome as codified in Virgil's Aeneid VI, and because of her proximity to Rome, the Cumaean Sibyl became the most famous among the Romans. The Erythraean Sibyl from modern-day Turkey was famed among Greeks, as was the oldest Hellenic oracle, the Sibyl of Dodona, possibly dating to the second millennium BC according to Herodotus, favored in the east.

The Cumaean Sibyl is one of the four sibyls painted by Raphael at Santa Maria della Pace (see gallery below). She was also painted by Andrea del Castagno (Uffizi Gallery, illustration right), and in the Sistine Ceiling of Michelangelo her powerful presence overshadows every other sibyl, even her younger and more beautiful sisters, such as the Delphic Sibyl.

There are various names for the Cumaean Sibyl besides the "Herophile" of Pausanias and Lactantius or the Aeneids "Deiphobe, daughter of Glaucus": "Amaltheia", "Demophile" or "Taraxandra" are all offered in various references.

Ancient Roman prophecies

The story of the acquisition of the Sibylline Books by Lucius Tarquinius Superbus, the semi-legendary last king of the Roman Kingdom, or Tarquinius Priscus, is one of the famous mythic elements of Roman history.Centuries ago, concurrent with the 50th Olympiad, not long before the expulsion of Rome's kings, an old woman "who was not a native of the country" arrived incognita in Rome. She offered nine books of prophecies to King Tarquin; and as the king declined to purchase them, owing to the exorbitant price she demanded, she burned three and offered the remaining six to Tarquin at the same stiff price, which he again refused, whereupon she burned three more and repeated her offer. Tarquin then relented and purchased the last three at the full original price, whereupon she "disappeared from among men". 

The books were thereafter kept in the Temple of Jupiter on the Capitoline Hill, Rome, to be consulted only in emergencies. The temple burned down in the 80s BC, and the books with it, necessitating a re-collection of Sibylline prophecies from all parts of the empire (Tacitus 6.12). These were carefully sorted and those determined to be legitimate were saved in the rebuilt temple. The Emperor Augustus had them moved to the Temple of Apollo on the Palatine Hill, where they remained for most of the remaining Imperial Period.

The Cumaean Sibyl is featured in the works of various Roman authors, including Virgil (the Eclogues, the Aeneid), Ovid (the Metamorphoses) and Petronius (the Satyricon).

Stories recounted in Virgil's Aeneid
The Cumaean Sibyl prophesied by “singing the fates” and writing on oak leaves. These would be arranged inside the entrance of her cave, but if the wind blew and scattered them, she would not help to reassemble the leaves and recreate the original prophecy.

The Sibyl was a guide to the underworld (Hades), whose entrance lay at the nearby crater of Avernus. Aeneas employed her services before his descent to the lower world to visit his dead father Anchises, but she warned him that it was no light undertaking:

The Sibyl acts as a bridge between the worlds of the living and the dead (cf. concept of liminality). She shows Aeneas the way to Avernus and teaches him what he needs to know about the dangers of their journey.

Stories recounted in Ovid's Metamorphoses
Although she was a mortal, the Sibyl lived about a thousand years. She attained this longevity when Apollo offered to grant her a wish in exchange for her virginity; she took a handful of sand and asked to live for as many years as the grains of sand she held. Later, after she refused the god's love, he allowed her body to wither away because she failed to ask for eternal youth. Her body grew smaller with age and eventually was kept in a jar (ampulla). Eventually only her voice was left (Metamorphoses 14; compare the myth of Tithonus, the lover of Eos, who was also granted immortality but not eternal youth).

Christianity
Virgil may have been influenced by Hebrew texts, according to Tacitus, amongst others. Constantine, the Christian emperor, in his first address to the assembly, interpreted the whole of The Eclogues as a reference to the coming of Christ, and quoted a long passage of the Sibylline Oracles (Book 8) containing an acrostic in which the initials from a series of verses read: Jesus Christ Son of God Saviour Cross.

In the Middle Ages, both the Cumaean Sibyl and Virgil were considered prophets of the birth of Christ, because the fourth of Virgil's Eclogues appears to contain a Messianic prophecy by the Sibyl. In it, she foretells the coming of a saviour, whom Christians identified as Jesus. This was identified by early Christians as such—one reason why Dante Alighieri later chose Virgil as his guide through the underworld in the Divine Comedy. Similarly, Michelangelo prominently featured the Cumaean Sibyl in the Sistine Chapel among the Old Testament prophets, as had earlier works such as the Tree of Jesse miniature in the Ingeberg Psalter (c. 1210).

Literary references
 The epigraph to T. S. Eliot's poem The Waste Land (1922) is a quote from the Satyricon of Petronius (48.8) wherein Trimalchio states, "Nam Sibyllam quidem Cumīs ego ipse oculīs meīs vīdī in ampullā pendere, et cum illī puerī dīcerent: Σίβυλλα τί θέλεις; respondēbat illa: ἀποθανεῖν θέλω." ("For I indeed once saw with my own eyes the Sibyl at Cumae hanging in her jar, and when the boys asked her, 'Sibyl, what do you want?' she answered 'I want to die'.")
Gerard Manley Hopkins' so-called "caudal" (i.e., lengthened) sonnet "Spelt from Sybil's Leaves" offers a somber prophecy and meditation on life and death.
 The title of Sylvia Plath's semi-autobiographical novel The Bell Jar has been said to be a reference to the ampulla in which the Sibyl lived.
 Robert Graves fashioned a poetic prophesy by the Sibyl to bind the story together in his work of historical fiction, I, Claudius (1934).
 Geoffrey Hill's poem "After Cumae" in For the Unfallen (1958) also refers to the Sibyl's "mouthy cave".
 Mary Shelley claimed in the introduction to her novel The Last Man that in 1818 she discovered, in the Sibyl's cave near Naples, a collection of prophetic writings painted on leaves by the Cumaean Sibyl. She claimed she edited these writings into the current first-person narrative of a man living at the end of the 21st century, which in-story proves to be the end of humanity.
 Science fiction writer David Drake, in his story "To Bring the Light" (1996), suggests that the Cumaean Sibyl was actually a time traveler - Flavia Herosilla, a well-educated woman from Imperial Rome of the 3rd century, who was sent back in time by a lightning strike, arriving at the moment of Rome's beginnings around 751 BC. She came to Cumae after ensuring that Remus and Romulus would indeed found Rome. Having arrived from a thousand years in the future, she was in a position to make some accurate prophecies.
 In Tyrant's Tomb (2019), the Cumaean Sibyl is shown to be selling the Sibylline books to King Tarquin.
 South African artist William Kentridge created an opera, Waiting for the Sibyl, based on the legends of the Cumaean Sibyl. The opera was first performed in Rome at Teatro dell'Opera di Roma in 2019.

Representations of the Sibyl of Cumae

The caves at Cumae and Baiae

The famous cave known as the "Antro della Sibilla" was discovered by Amedeo Maiuri in 1932, the identification of which he based on the description by Virgil in the 6th book of the Aeneid, and also from the description by an anonymous author known as pseudo-Justin. (Virg. Aen. 6. 45–99; Ps-Justin, 37). The cave is a trapezoidal passage over 131 m long, running parallel to the side of the hill and cut out of the  volcanic tuff stone and leads to an innermost chamber, where the Sibyl was thought to have prophesied.

A nearby tunnel through the acropolis now known as the "Crypta Romana" (part of Agrippa and Octavian's defenses in the war against Sextus Pompey) was previously identified as the Grotto of the Sibyl. The inner chamber was later used as a burial chamber during the 4th or 5th century AD (M. Napoli 1965, 105) by people living at the site.

Some archaeologists have proposed an alternative cave site as the home of the Sibyl. A tunnel complex near Baiae (part of the volcanically active Phlegraean fields) leads to an underground geothermally-heated stream that could be presented to visitors as the river Styx. The layout of the tunnels conforms to the description in the Aeneid of Aeneas' journey to the underworld and back.

Primary sources 
Virgil, Aeneis vi.268 ff
Isidore, Etymologiae viii.8.5
Servius, In Aeneida vi.72, 321
Lactantius, Divinae institutiones i.6.10–11
Solinus, Collectanea rerum memorabilium ii.16, 17, 18

See also 
Sebile
The Golden Bough (mythology)
Dido (Queen of Carthage)

References

Bibliography 

 

Ancient Roman religion
Sibyls
Characters in Roman mythology
Characters in Book VI of the Aeneid
Ancient Greek priestesses
Cumae (ancient city)
Metamorphoses in Greek mythology